Hemiboreal means halfway between the temperate and subarctic (or boreal) zones. The term is most frequently used in the context of climates and ecosystems.

Botany
A hemiboreal forest has some characteristics of a boreal forest to the north, and also shares features with temperate-zone forests to the south.  Coniferous trees predominate in the hemiboreal zone, but a significant number of deciduous species, such as aspens, oaks, maples, ash trees, birches, beeches, hazels, and hornbeams, also take root here.

Climate
The term sometimes denotes the form of climate characteristic of the zone of hemiboreal forests—specifically, the climates designated Dfb, Dwb and Dsb in the Köppen climate classification scheme.  On occasion, it is applied to all areas that have long, cold winters and warm (but not hot) summers—which also including areas that are semiarid(BS) and arid(BW) based on average annual precipitation. It can also be applied to some areas with a subpolar oceanic climate (Cfc), particularly those with continental climate characteristics.

Examples

Examples of locations with hemiboreal climates or ecosystems include: 
Much of southern Canada (all of southeastern Canada except for parts of southern Ontario as well as the central Prairie Provinces outside the grasslands)
Within the United States: most parts of  Michigan, Wisconsin, and Minnesota, along with eastern North Dakota and the Adirondacks of New York State and Northern New England. Also, many mountain areas in the western United States.
The Southern Siberian rainforest in Russia includes hemiboreal forests.
Parts of northeast China bordering Russia
Northern areas of Japan including Hokkaido
 Parts of southern Norway and Southern Sweden except the most southern municipalities.
Latvia, Lithuania, Belarus and Estonia.
Coastal zone and archipelago of Turku in Finland and region of Åland.
The Australian Alps in eastern Victoria and southeastern New South Wales, which makes up a small portion in the southeastern region of the continent, and the Central Highlands in Tasmania.
The Southern Alps in New Zealand's South Island.
on the Wet Andes region located in the Southern Cone of South America, it has characteristics of a Mediterranean-influenced continental climate

References

Forests
Taiga and boreal forests
Biogeography
Climate zones
Habitats